The 1971 Buffalo Bills season was the franchise's second season in the National Football League, and the 12th overall.

For the second time in four seasons, the Bills finished with only one victory. The Bills 1–13 record (a 0.071 winning percentage) remains the worst in franchise history. The team allowed 394 points, the most in franchise history for a 14-game season.

The season began in turmoil when coach John Rauch resigned, forcing pro personnel director Harvey Johnson to assume the position for the second time on an interim basis.

Buffalo lost their first ten games of the season, extending their losing streak to 15 and winless streak to 17, dating back to the previous season. They were held scoreless in four games; their minus-210 point differential is the worst in the team's history, and one of the forty worst point-differentials in NFL history.

Running back O. J. Simpson would have a stellar year, despite the Bills poor team record. Simpson would rush for 742 yards on 183 attempts. However, Simpson would only score 5 touchdowns, the fewest for a single season in his career. The Bills would only score 21 touchdowns as a team during the 1971 season, a franchise low.

Offseason

NFL Draft

The Bills had a strong draft in 1971, selecting several players who would have long-term impact with the team.

Wide receiver J. D. Hill played five seasons for the Bills, making the Pro Bowl in his second season. 
Fullback Jim Braxton was an effective blocker for star tailback O. J. Simpson for the next seven seasons. 
Right tackle Donnie Green became a key component in the Bills' "Electric Company" offensive line for the next seven seasons. 
Receiver Bob Chandler played with the Bills for nine seasons, making second team All-Pro in 1975 and 1977, and leading the league in receptions from '75–'77, with 176 catches.

Personnel

Coaches/Staff

Source: https://pro-football-history.com/franchise/7/buffalo-bills-coaches

Final roster

Regular season

Schedule

Standings

Game summaries

Week 1

Week 11

Awards and honors

References

 Bills on Pro Football Reference
 Bills on jt-sw.com
 Bills Stats on jt-sw.com
 

Buffalo Bills seasons
Buffalo Bills
Buffalo